The following lists events that happened during 1892 in South Africa.

Incumbents
 Governor of the Cape of Good Hope and High Commissioner for Southern Africa:Henry Brougham Loch.
 Governor of the Colony of Natal: Charles Bullen Hugh Mitchell.
 State President of the Orange Free State: Francis William Reitz.
 State President of the South African Republic: Paul Kruger.
 Prime Minister of the Cape of Good Hope: Cecil John Rhodes.

Events

February
 8 – The Orange Free State, Transvaal and the Cape Colony officially adopt a uniform standard time of GMT+01:30.

August
 20 – The Johannesburg Reform Committee is established by prominent Johannesburg citizens.

September
 8 – The South African and International Exhibition opens
 15 – The railway line from Cape Town via Bloemfontein, with connections to Port Elizabeth and East London, is completed to Germiston.

Births
 3 January – J.R.R. Tolkien, writer, poet, philologist and professor. (d. 1973)

Deaths

Railways

Railway lines opened
 8 February – Cape Midland – Rosmead Junction to Stormberg Junction to link with the Cape Eastern, .
 7 May – Free State – Bloemfontein to Vaal River Bridge, .
 21 May – Cape Eastern – Albert Junction (Dreunberg Junction) to Bethulie Bridge, .

 21 May – Free State – Bethulie Bridge to Springfontein, .
 20 June – Transvaal – Malelane to Nelspruit, .
 12 July – Natal – Danskraal to Natal-Free State border, .
 12 July – Free State – Natal-Free State border to Harrismith, .
 15 September – Transvaal – Vaal River Bridge to Germiston, .

Locomotives
Cape
 The Cape Government Railways places the first six 7th Class 4-8-0 Mastodon type steam locomotives in service.

Transvaal
 The Nederlandsche-Zuid-Afrikaansche Spoorweg-Maatschappij of the Zuid-Afrikaansche Republiek (Transvaal Republic) places the first of twenty  tank locomotives in service.

References

South Africa
Years in South Africa
History of South Africa
 
1890s in South Africa
Years of the 19th century in South Africa